Beware is a studio album by Will Oldham. It was released under the moniker Bonnie "Prince" Billy on Drag City in 2009.

Critical reception

Critical response to Beware was generally favorable and positive. At Metacritic, which assigns a normalized rating out of 100 to reviews from mainstream critics, the album has received an average score of 74 ("Generally favorable reviews"), based on 32 professional reviews, and the average user rating for the album is 8.5 (out of 10) based on 12 users' votes. Ben Ratliff of The New York Times gave a positive review of the album, writing: "There's a sense here of smart people being made to focus on a strange project."

Track listing

 Tracks 12–13 were only available on the initial pressing and have been removed from subsequent pressings. These tracks have been released as a digital download single and the new eleven-track version of Beware has an alternative cover. These changes were instigated by Will Oldham who felt that I Am Goodbye is more suitable as the final track.

Personnel
 Will Oldham – music

Backing band
 Joshua Abrams – bass guitar, guimbri, vocals
 Jennifer Hutt – violin, vocals
 Emmett Kelly – guitar, keyboards, vocals
 Michael Zerang – percussion, marimba, drums, vocals

Special guests
 Greg Leisz – mandolin, pedal steel guitar
 Rob Mazurek – cornet
 Dee Alexander – vocals
 Leroy Bach – organ
 Jim Becker – banjo
 Robert Cruz – accordion
 D.V. DeVincentis – saxophone
 Jon Langford – vocals
 Nicole Mitchell – flute
 Azita Youssefi – piano, synthesizer
 Neil Strauch – engineering, mixing
 Paul Oldham – mastering
 Sammy Harkham – back cover, label design
 Dan Osborn – layout design
 Jeff Hamilton – cover illustration

Charts

References

External links
 

2009 albums
Will Oldham albums
Drag City (record label) albums
Domino Recording Company albums